Xinhua Township is a township of Tianquan County in western Sichuan province, China, located  northeast of the county seat and  northwest of Ya'an as the crow flies. , it has 10 villages under its administration.

References 

Township-level divisions of Sichuan
Ya'an